Sarah Mardini (born 1995) is a Syrian former competition swimmer, lifeguard and human rights activist. Fleeing her country in 2015 during the Syrian civil war with her sister, Olympic swimmer Yusra Mardini, they pulled their boat with other refugees towards the Mediterranean coast of Greece, saving themselves and the other passengers. Continuing their journey across the Balkans, they reached Berlin, Germany, the same year.

After the sisters had been granted political asylum in Germany, Sarah Mardini joined a non-governmental organization to help refugees on the Greek island of Lesbos. Along with human rights activist Seán Binder, she was arrested in 2018 and accused by Greek authorities of espionage, aiding illegal immigration and belonging to a criminal organization. These charges have been refuted by human rights organizations such as Amnesty International, denouncing the accusations against Mardini and other humanitarian workers and defending their actions as legal activities.

Early life and flight 
Sarah Mardini grew up in Darayya, a suburb of Damascus, with her parents and two younger sisters, Yusra and Shahed. As children, both Sarah and Yusra were encouraged and trained for swimming competitions by their father, a professional coach and former sports swimmer himself. Later, they joined recognized swimming teams in Syria as well as the Syrian national swimming team.

When their home was destroyed in the Syrian Civil War, Sarah and Yusra decided to flee Syria in August 2015. They reached Lebanon, and then Turkey. They arranged to be smuggled onto a Greek island by boat with 18 other migrants in a boat that was designed for no more than 6 or 7 people. After the motor stopped working and the boat began to take on water in the Aegean Sea, Yusra, Sarah, and two other people, who were able to swim, jumped into the water. They pulled the boat through the water for over three hours, until the group reached the island of Lesbos. Following this, they travelled on foot, by bus and train through Greece, the Balkans, Hungary and Austria to Germany, where they settled in Berlin in September 2015. Their parents and younger sister later also fled Syria and were granted political asylum in Germany. In 2017, Mardini became a student at Bard College Berlin after being awarded a full scholarship from the College's Program for International Education and Social Change.

Activism for refugees and legal accusations 

Advocating for refugees, she and her sister Yusra have spoken before the UN General Assembly in New York and for audiences in Germany, France, Belgium, the Czech Republic and Bulgaria. In autumn 2016, 21-year-old Sarah Mardini returned to Lesbos to work as a volunteer lifeguard with Emergency Response Centre International (ERCI), a Greek humanitarian NGO for refugees that cooperated with Frontex and Greek border authorities. ERCI had been operating a medical centre in Moria refugee camp, described by Human Rights Watch and other organizations as an "open air prison". Having assisted refugees as a translator in this camp for six months, Mardini said: "I talk them through it. I tell them, ‘I know what you feel, because I’ve been through it. I lived it, and I survived’, and they feel better, because I am a refugee just like them."

Mardini was arrested on Lesbos airport on 21 August 2018, when she intended to return to Germany for the beginning of her second year at college in Berlin. On the same day, Seán Binder, a trained rescue diver and volunteer for the same NGO, went to the police station to meet with Sarah Mardini and was arrested himself. A third member of the NGO, Nassos Karakitsos was arrested shortly afterwards.

According to a report in The Guardian, they and two other NGO members were detained in pre-trial detention for 106 days, "with Mardini being incarcerated in Athens’ high-security Korydallos prison." After more than three months in prison, Binder and Mardini were released on 5,000 Euro bail and could leave Greece. Mardini, Binder and further Greek activists for refugees were accused of being members of a criminal organization, human trafficking, money laundering and fraud by Greek authorities.

Court proceedings 
The defendants' lawyers said the Greek authorities failed to produce concrete evidence in support of the accusations. If ultimately convicted, the accused could be sentenced to 25 years in prison. Apart from the 24 former members of ERCI, a number of other humanitarian workers have been facing prosecution in Greece, similar to what happened in Italy, where providing aid to migrants has also been criminalised.

On 18 November 2021, a court in Lesbos adjourned the legal proceedings against 24 members of ERCI, including Mardini and Binder, "due to lack of jurisdiction of the court" and referred the case to a higher court. On 18 November 2022, Binder, Mardini and Greek fellow defendant Nassos Karakitsos attended their court summons at the first instance court, and declared that they had nothing to add to their earlier statements. Their trial was set to begin on 10 January 2023, with the accused facing charges classified as misdemeanor crimes, while the felony charges have not been concluded.

After more than four years of protracted legal procedures by the Greek authorities and personal psychological stress and uncertainty for the defendants after the first arrests, the trial of 24 rescuers began on 10 January 2023. On the following 13 January, the court ruled that the charges of espionage against Mardini and the other defendants were at least partially inadmissible, thus following objections by their lawyers. Among other objections, these were the court's initial failure to translate documents for the foreign defendants into a language they could understand as well as faulty documentation of some of the charges. However, the charges of human trafficking remained and the defendants must continue to live in insecurity pending a second trial. According to a report in the German weekly Die Zeit, the verdict was not a complete acquittal for Mardini, Binder and the other defendants, but at least an intermediate win, and also a political signal in a procedure that a report by the European Parliament called the 'currently largest case of criminalizing solidarity in Europe'. Following the verdict, Seán Binder commented to journalists outside the courtroom:

Statements by international human rights organizations 
Mary Lawlor, UN Special Rapporteur on the Situation of Human Rights Defenders, criticized the Greek authorities' refusal to allow Mardini to be present at the November 2021 court session and said “The fact that authorities have spent more than three years investigating the case has been a deterrent to civil society working for migrant rights in Greece.” With regard to the accusations against Mardini and Binder, she further said: “To what have we come that we go against people who are offering solidarity? A guilty verdict for Ms. Mardini and Mr. Binder would be a dark day for Greece, and a dark day for human rights in Europe.”

Giorgos Kosmopoulos, Senior Campaigner on Migration for Amnesty International was quoted as follows: “These trumped-up charges are farcical and should never have resulted in Sarah and Seán appearing in court. Today’s adjournment means that having already waited over three years, this ordeal will continue to drag on for Sarah and Seán, leaving them in limbo. We call for the Greek authorities to uphold their human rights obligations, and drop the charges against Sarah and Seán.”

In popular culture 
The Mardini sisters' early life and flight from Syria to Germany was described in Yusra Mardini's autobiographical book Butterfly. Further, Sarah and Yusra Mardini are the main characters of The Swimmers, a biographical film based on their story, directed by Sally El Hoseini and produced by Stephen Daldry; Sarah and Yusra are portrayed by real-life sisters Manal and Nathalie Issa. The film premiered at the Toronto International Film Festival on 8 September 2022 and released for streaming by Netflix in November 2022.

See also 

 2015 European migrant crisis
 Frontex - controversies

References

External links 
 Video about the accusations against Binder, Mardini and other members of ERCI by Amnesty International
 Video 'I am not a people smuggler’ with Sarah Mardini on BBC News
 Video "How I was arrested for handing out blankets to refugees" with Sarah Mardini at TEDxLondonWomen
 2020 report on European restrictive, sanctioning and punitive measures against people who defend refugees and migrants’ rights. by Amnesty International

People from Damascus
Syrian refugees
Human rights activists
Syrian activists
Sea rescue
Refugees of the Syrian civil war
Syrian female swimmers
1995 births
Living people
Syrian emigrants to Germany
Prisoners and detainees of Greece